Ziya Taner (1924–2001) was a Macedonian-born Turkish football manager.

Honours
İstanbulspor
TFF First League : 1967-68

Ankaragücü
 Turkish Cup : 1971-72; Runner-up : 1972-73

Beşiktaş
Turkish Cup Runner-up : 1983-84

1924 births
2001 deaths
Sportspeople from Skopje
Macedonian Turks
Yugoslav football managers
Macedonian football managers
Turkish football managers
MKE Ankaragücü managers
İstanbulspor managers
Eskişehirspor managers
Beşiktaş J.K. managers
Süper Lig managers
Yugoslav expatriate football managers
Expatriate football managers in Turkey
Yugoslav expatriate sportspeople in Turkey